"Unbreakable" is a song by American R&B-soul singer Alicia Keys from her live album, Unplugged (2005). Written by Keys, Kanye West, and Harold Lilly, the track features a Wurlitzer riff, and is built around a sample of Eddie Kendricks' 1977 song "Intimate Friends", written by Garry Glenn. It was released as the album's lead single in 2005 and peaked at number thirty-four on the U.S. Billboard Hot 100, becoming Keys' first single to miss the top twenty since 2002's "How Come You Don't Call Me", and failed to peak inside the top forty on Billboard Pop 100. It was nevertheless a big success on the Hot R&B/Hip-Hop Songs chart, where it landed at number four.

The lyrics mention names of notable couples Ike and Tina Turner, Bill and Camille Cosby, Oprah Winfrey and Stedman Graham, Florida and James Evans, Will and Jada Pinkett Smith, Kimora Lee and Russell Simmons, and Joe and Katherine Jackson, as well as The Jackson 5.

The song received nominations for Best Female R&B Vocal Performance and Best R&B Song at the 2006 Grammy Awards which were awarded to "We Belong Together" by Mariah Carey. It also won two NAACP Image Award, for "Outstanding Song" and "Outstanding Music Video".

This song was written in 2003 to be included on The Diary of Alicia Keys, but was omitted in favor of "Diary", and nearly missed the album Unplugged. She said, "The song was always one of my favorites, but I did not think it would fit well into my second album".

Critical reception 
Jon Pareles of The New York Times wrote that the song "doesn't aim for timelessness" as "it's as full of topical references as a hip-hop song".

Music video
Two music videos were produced for the song:
 Unplugged Version, directed by Alex Coletti
 BET Version, directed by Justin Francis

Track listings
US 12" single
A. "Unbreakable" (Radio Mix) – 4:14
B. "Unbreakable" (Radio Mix) – 4:14

US promotional CD single
 "Unbreakable" (Radio Edit) – 4:14
 "Unbreakable" (Call Out Hook) – 0:10
 "Unbreakable" (Radio Edit) (MP3 format) – 4:14

US promotional DVD single
"Unbreakable" (BET Video)

Charts

Weekly charts

Year-end charts

Release history

References

External links 
Unbreakable at Discogs

2005 singles
Alicia Keys songs
Song recordings produced by Kanye West
Songs written by Alicia Keys
Songs written by Kanye West
Songs written by Harold Lilly (songwriter)
2005 songs
J Records singles